Franke Jon Previte (born May 2, 1946) is an American singer, songwriter, and Academy Award-winning composer. He was the lead singer of the 1980s pop rock band Franke and the Knockouts.

Biography
Born and raised in New Brunswick, New Jersey to Franke Previte Sr. (an opera singer), Previte was with the New Jersey rock quintet Franke and the Knockouts as the singer and songwriter. Previously he had sung with the Oxford Watch Band and the heavy metal band Bull Angus.

Franke and the Knockouts were signed by Millennium Records in 1981 and had three U.S. Top 40 singles, as well as two Top 50 albums. Their biggest single, "Sweetheart", was written by Previte and Knockout guitarist Billy Elworthy, and became a Top 10 hit in 1981. The group's other two Top 40 hits were "You're My Girl" and "Without You (Not Another Lonely Night)".

The band switched to MCA Records in 1984, and split up around 1986. Previte co-wrote music for the hit soundtrack for the 1987 movie Dirty Dancing, including "(I've Had) The Time of My Life," and Eric Carmen's hit "Hungry Eyes".

Awards
Academy Award for Best Achievement in Music; Best Song for 1987 for Dirty Dancing'''s "(I've Had) The Time of My Life" with co-composers John DeNicola and Donald Markowitz.

That same year Previte also received a Golden Globe and a Grammy nomination. "(I've Had) The Time of My Life" also won the ASCAP song of the year award. In 2014, the song was chosen as one of ASCAP's top 100 songs ever written, landing at number 15.

Previte was chosen as one of America's top 25 songwriters to represent the US in a songwriter summit in the USSR, which resulted in a release of an album called Music Speaks Louder Than Words'' in 1990.

Today, Previte helps raise money for the Pancreatic Cancer Action Network charity in Patrick Swayze's honor. He continues to raise money for the charity with his new band, The Brotherhood. "If you're a songwriter then you're in the Brotherhood,” said Previte.

See also
 Dirty Dancing soundtrack

References

Living people
Best Original Song Academy Award-winning songwriters
Golden Globe Award-winning musicians
Songwriters from New Jersey
American male composers
21st-century American composers
Musicians from New Brunswick, New Jersey
1946 births
21st-century American male musicians
American male songwriters